Gnophodes is a genus of butterflies from the subfamily Satyrinae in the family Nymphalidae.

Species
Gnophodes betsimena (Boisduval, 1833) – banded evening brown
Gnophodes chelys (Fabricius, 1793) – dusky evening brown or lobed evening brown
Gnophodes grogani Sharpe, 1901

References 
"Gnophodes Doubleday, [1849]" at Markku Savela's Lepidoptera and Some Other Life Forms

Melanitini
Butterfly genera